Lancaster Historic District, also known as Old Town Lancaster, is a national historic district located at Lancaster, Lancaster County, Pennsylvania. It includes 578 contributing buildings in a predominantly residential area of Lancaster, with buildings mostly dated between about 1840 and 1910. The district includes a few buildings dated to the 18th century. Residential buildings include two- and three-story Victorian brick rowhouses. Notable non-residential buildings include the Demuth's Tobacco Shop, St. James Episcopal Church, and the Unitarian Universalist Church of Lancaster. Also located in the district is the separately listed Lancaster County Courthouse designed by noted Philadelphia architect Samuel Sloan (1815–1884).

It was listed on the National Register of Historic Places in 1979, with boundary increases in 1983 and 1984.

References

External links

 Demuth's Tobacco Shop website

Historic districts on the National Register of Historic Places in Pennsylvania
Buildings and structures in Lancaster, Pennsylvania
Tourist attractions in Lancaster, Pennsylvania
Historic districts in Lancaster County, Pennsylvania
National Register of Historic Places in Lancaster, Pennsylvania